Moalem town (Persian: شهرک معلم) is a town in north of Kermanshah city in western Iran.

Streets 
 Atar boulevard
 Rudaki boulevard
 Hafez boulevard
 dehkhoda boulevard
 molavi boulevard
 razi boulevard

References 

Populated places in Kermanshah Province